Cargo Pond is a pond in a moraine enclosed basin at the foot of the cliffs to the south end of Alatna Valley, in the Convoy Range of Victoria Land. This frozen pond was the site of a 1960–61 United States Antarctic Research Program field party (Parker Calkin, Roger Hart, and Ellory Schempp) which had to be evacuated in a hurry. Equipment and provisions stockpiled on the pond ice were eventually redistributed by the wind and lodged among the surrounding morainic boulders. A 1989–90 New Zealand Antarctic Research Program party (Trevor Chinn) camped nearby made frequent visits to the site to clean up the area, but also to acquire various 30-year-old exotic foods to supplement their standard camp fare.

References
 

Lakes of Victoria Land
Scott Coast